Blind Zero are a Portuguese rock band from the city of Porto. They won the 2003 MTV Europe Music Award for the Best Portuguese Act.

History
Blind Zero started out 1994 releasing their first EP, Recognize (1995), which sold out in nine days, and is today a collection item. The first album Trigger (1995), was produced by Ronnie Champagne. It was the first rock album by a Portuguese band to reach the gold label.

In 1996, Blind Zero revealed a new sound with the Flexogravity EP, a very experimental record with a fusion of sounds, shared with a hip-hop band from Porto, Mind da Gap. This was considered by many the EP of the year. Also in 1996, the band recorded an acoustic album, Transradio, one of the first Enhanced CDs (CD Extra) in Europe. The album was recorded live at Antena 3 radio. Months later they were invited to participate in SCYPE (Song Contest for Youth Programs in Europe), a festival gathering bands from all over Europe. They recorded a new original song, "My House", and won the contest.

In 1997, Blind Zero recorded Redcoast, the second album of originals produced by Michael Vail Blum. Redcoast was produced at Sony Music/New York studios by  Grammy Award winner Mark Wilder.

In 1998, they recorded with Mário Caldato the song "The Wire", and spent 1999 working on their third album, One Silent Accident, which was released in 2000 and produced by Don Fleming.

In 2002, they recorded one of the most famous songs by David Bowie, "Heroes".

In January 2003, they started recording A Way to Bleed your Lover, produced by Mário Barreiros, adding a new member to the band, Miguel Ferreira. The album also contained contributions by Jorge Palma and Dana Colley (Twinmen/ex-Morphine). In May 2003, Blind Zero were invited by MTV to perform live in Milan, as part of the initiative of launching MTV Portugal. Later that year they won the "Best Portuguese Act" award at the MTV Europe Music Awards 2003 in Edinburgh, becoming the first Portuguese band to receive an award by MTV. In December, the specialized press considered A Way to Bleed your Lover the best album of the year in Portugal.

In 2005 they released The night before and a new day with Pedro Vidal (ex-Stealing Orchestra) as a member, replacing Marco Nunes on solo guitar.

In 2007 they released Time Machine (memories undone), a best of Blind Zero unplugged album, associated with their 13th anniversary.

In 2010, the album Luna Park was released on 30 May. Three singles were released from it, "Slow Time Love", "Snow Girl" and "The Tallest Building On Earth".

In 2013, Kill Drama was released. Its first single was "I See Desire", which reflects the desire of young Portuguese people to work in foreign countries due to Portugal's economic situation. The album also included the singles "From You", "High and Low", and "I Will Take You Home". To celebrate Blind Zero's 20 years of existence they released Kill Drama II. It contains the same songs as Kill Drama, but all of them featured a different artist.

After Luna Park, Kill Drama and Kill Drama II, three albums with pop vibes, they released in October 2017 Ofteen Trees, an album that is well received and has much more rock 'n' roll than those previous.

Discography
 1995: Trigger
 1996: Flexogravity (with Mind Da Gap)
 1996: Transradio
 1997: Redcoast
 2000: One Silent Accident
 2003: A Way to Bleed Your Lover
 2004: MTV Live in Milan
 2005: The Night Before and a New Day
 2007: Time Machine (memories undone) - live best of unplugged
 2010: Luna Park
 2013: Kill Drama I
 2015: Kill Drama II
 2017: Often Trees

Notes

References

External links
Official website
Official Facebook page

Portuguese musical groups
MTV Europe Music Award winners